Kosovo competed at the 2019 European Games in Minsk from 21 to 30 June 2019. Kosovo had previously competed at the 2015 European Games in Baku, Azerbaijan, where it won 1 bronze medal. Kosovo was represented by 12 athletes in 5 sports in these competitions.

Medalists

Competitors

Archery

Recurve

Boxing 

Men

Women

Judo 

Women

Men

Karate 

Men

Table tennis

Men

See also 
	
 Sport in Kosovo

References 

Nations at the 2019 European Games
European Games
2019